The following is a list of land border crossings of Azerbaijan, including both highway and rail crossings.

References

 
Azerbaijan